Youngsong Girls' High School is a high school in Daegu, South Korea. The school offers systematic courtesy education, foreign language education, service and club activities, and Taekwondo.

History
The school received approval to begin construction on 1 November 1979, and the first ceremony at the entrance was held on 5 March 1979.

 1974 Dec 17th : Approved to establish 'Geunyoung Haksuk' as a school corporation
 1974 Dec 17th : Dr. Kim Jong-Ok inaugurated as the first chairman
 1979 Jan 5th : Approval of establishment of 9 classes of Baeyoung Women's Commercial High School
 1979 Jan 11th : Inauguration of the first Principal of Yeo Won-hoe
 1979 Mar 5th : 1st freshman entrance ceremony held (180 students)
 1982 Feb 11th : 1st graduation ceremony held
 1986 Mar 11th : Changed the school name to Baeyoung Girls' High School
 1997 Feb 1st : Changed the school name to Yeongsong Girls' High School
 2015 Mar 1st : Inauguration of the 13th Principal Seong Nak-Seo
 2017 Feb 2nd : The 35th graduation ceremony (338 graduates, 14,789 total)
 2019 Mar 1st : Inauguration of the 14th principal Kim Jeong-gyun

Symbols
The yulan is the flower symbol of the school. The six white petals symbolise purity and the oval green leaf shows an amicable personality and hope. The fragrance symbolises feminine grace. The school tree is pine. The green of the pine symbolises the four seasons and represents the invariable attitude to truth in research and strong constancy and a spirit of the endurance.

References
Official website

Educational institutions established in 1979
High schools in Daegu
1979 establishments in South Korea
Girls' schools in South Korea
Buk District, Daegu